The Man in the Iron Mask is a 1977 television film loosely adapted from the 1847–1850 novel The Vicomte de Bragelonne by Alexandre Dumas and presenting several plot similarities with the 1939 film version. It was produced by Norman Rosemont for ITC Entertainment, and starred Richard Chamberlain as King Louis XIV and his twin Philippe, Patrick McGoohan as Nicolas Fouquet, Ralph Richardson as Jean-Baptiste Colbert, Louis Jourdan as D'Artagnan, and Ian Holm as the Chevalier Duval.  Jenny Agutter plays Louis XIV's mistress, Louise de la Vallière. Vivien Merchant appears as Queen Marie-Therese.  It was directed by Mike Newell.

Plot

In this version, the twins' ages are swapped. Philippe is the firstborn and rightful king, who had been spirited away at birth and raised with no knowledge of his true identity in a plot by Cardinal Mazarin to manipulate Louis before his own death. Colbert and D'Artagnan plot to replace Louis (who is an ineffective king more interested in dancing and pleasure than the welfare of France) with Philippe, and in the process bring down the corrupt finance minister Fouquet, who has embezzled from the national treasury. Louis is repulsed by his own wife and makes repeated advances on Louise, who is in turn repulsed by him yet falls in love with Philippe.

Cast

 Richard Chamberlain as King Louis XIV/Philippe
 Jenny Agutter as Louise de La Vallière, Louis XIV's mistress
 Patrick McGoohan as Nicolas Fouquet
 Ralph Richardson as Jean-Baptiste Colbert
 Louis Jourdan as D'Artagnan
 Ian Holm as the Chevalier Duval
 Hugh Fraser as Montfleury
 Brenda Bruce as Queen Anne of Austria
 Vivien Merchant as Queen Marie-Therese

Production

Filming

Although a made-for-TV movie, actual locations in France were used for filming, including the Château de Fontainebleau and Fouquet's actual chateau of Vaux-le-Vicomte for the final ball scene.

External links

 

1977 television films
1977 films
British television films
Films based on The Vicomte of Bragelonne: Ten Years Later
British swashbuckler films
Films directed by Mike Newell
1970s adventure films
Cultural depictions of Louis XIV
Cultural depictions of Jean-Baptiste Colbert
Man in the Iron Mask
Twins in fiction
Television shows based on works by Alexandre Dumas
1970s British films